A dioptra (sometimes also named dioptre or diopter, from ) is a classical astronomical and surveying instrument, dating from the 3rd century BC. The dioptra was a sighting tube or, alternatively, a rod with a sight at both ends, attached to a stand. If fitted with protractors, it could be used to measure angles.

Use
Greek astronomers used the dioptra to measure the positions of stars; both Euclid and Geminus refer to the dioptra in their astronomical works.

It continued in use as an effective surveying tool. Adapted to surveying, the dioptra is similar to the theodolite, or surveyor's transit, which dates to the sixteenth century. It is a more accurate version of the groma.

There is some speculation that it may have been used to build the Eupalinian aqueduct. Called "one of the greatest engineering achievements of ancient times," it is a tunnel 1,036 meters (4,000 ft) long, "excavated through Mount Kastro on the Greek island of Samos, in the 6th century BCE" during the reign of Polycrates.  Scholars disagree, however, whether the dioptra was available that early.

An entire book about the construction and surveying usage of the dioptra is credited to Hero of Alexandria (also known as Heron; a brief description of the book is available online; see Lahanas link, below). Hero was "one of history’s most ingenious engineers and applied mathematicians."

The dioptra was used extensively on aqueduct building projects. Screw turns on several different parts of the instrument made it easy to calibrate for very precise measurements

The dioptra was replaced as a surveying instrument by the theodolite.

See also 
Alidade

References

Further reading
 Isaac Moreno Gallo (2006) The Dioptra Tesis and reconstruction of the Dioptra.
 Michael Jonathan Taunton Lewis (2001), Surveying Instruments of Greece and Rome, Cambridge University Press, 
 Lucio Russo (2004), The Forgotten Revolution: How Science Was Born in 300 BC and Why It Had To Be Reborn, Berlin: Springer. .
Evans, J., (1998) The History and Practice of Ancient Astronomy, pages 34–35. Oxford University Press.

External links 
 Michael Lahanas, Heron of Alexandria, Inventions, Biography, Science
 Nathan Sidoli (2005), Heron's Dioptra 35 and Analemma Methods: An Astronomical Determination of the Distance between Two Cities, Centaurus, 47(3), 236-258
 Bamber Gascoigne, History of Measurement, historyworld.net
 Tom M. Apostol (2004), The Tunnel of Samos, Engineering and Science, 64(4), 30-40

Ancient Greek astronomy
Astrometry
Astronomical instruments
Historical scientific instruments
Angle measuring instruments
Surveying instruments